Chris Coady (born June 5, 1978) is an American record producer and mixing engineer who is best known for his work with Yeah Yeah Yeahs, TV on the Radio, Deadbeat Darling, Grizzly Bear, Beach House, Blonde Redhead and others.

Since moving to New York City in 2001, Coady has produced several records that have been featured in Underground scene, including one of 2010's most critically acclaimed albums, Teen Dream by the indie rock duo Beach House. In 2011 he was selected in an article published by The Guardian as one of the ten next-generation producers to watch out for.

Discography

References

Living people
American record producers
Place of birth missing (living people)
1978 births